WIN 55,212-2 is a chemical described as an aminoalkylindole derivative, which produces effects similar to those of cannabinoids such as tetrahydrocannabinol (THC) but has an entirely different chemical structure.

WIN 55,212-2 is a potent cannabinoid receptor agonist that has been found to be a potent analgesic in a rat model of neuropathic pain. It activates p42 and p44 MAP kinase via receptor-mediated signaling.

At 5 μM WIN 55,212-2 inhibits ATP production in sperm in a CB1 receptor-dependent fashion.

WIN 55,212-2, along with HU-210 and JWH-133, may prevent the inflammation caused by amyloid beta proteins involved in Alzheimer's disease, in addition to preventing cognitive impairment and loss of neuronal markers. This anti-inflammatory action is induced through agonist action at cannabinoid receptors, which prevents microglial activation that elicits the inflammation.

WIN 55,212-2 is a full agonist at the CB1 cannabinoid receptor (Ki = 1.9 nM) and has much higher affinity than THC (Ki = 41 nM) for this receptor. WIN 55,212-2 is also an agonist of the PPARα and PPARγ nuclear receptors.

WIN 55,212-2 reduces voluntary wheel running in laboratory mice, but with effects that depend on both genetic background and sex.

In the United States, all CB1 receptor agonists of the 3-(1-naphthoyl)indole class such as WIN 55,212-2 are Schedule I Controlled Substances. WIN 55,212-2 is illegal in the UK.

See also 
 WIN 48,098 (Pravadoline)
 WIN 54,461 (6-Bromopravadoline)
 WIN 55,225 (JWH-200)
 WIN 56,098

References

Further reading

External links 
 

Aminoalkylindoles
4-Morpholinyl compunds
Naphthoylindoles
WIN compounds
CB1 receptor agonists